Richfield High School was a school formerly located in  Waco, Texas. The school began construction in 1960 and opened in September 1961. It was situated on the site of a World War I army airfield, Rich Field.

In 1986, Richfield was consolidated with two other high schools in Waco ISD — Waco High School and Jefferson-Moore High School. This merged school, the current Waco High School, is housed in the former Richfield building on N. 42nd Street in Waco.

The Richfield school mascot was the Ram and school colors were scarlet (red) and gray.

The most celebrated athletic success at Richfield was back-to-back Texas state girls' basketball championships in 1984 and 1985. The Richfield Ramblers (changed from Rams) completed both seasons with undefeated records and had a combined record of 66–0, one of the greatest accomplishments in Texas high school basketball history.

Notable alumni

Lyndon Lowell Olson, Jr, former U.S. ambassador to Sweden, (class of 1965)
Todd Haney, professional baseball player
Priscilla Richman Owen, federal court judge
Kevin Reynolds (class of 1970), movie director
Ralph Sheffield (class of 1973), Republican member of the Texas House of Representatives from Bell County
Tim Spehr, professional baseball player
Alfred Anderson, Professional Football Player
Pat Zachry (class of 1970), professional baseball player
John McClain (class of 1971), sportswriter

References

Defunct schools in Texas
Educational institutions established in 1961
Waco Independent School District high schools
High schools in Waco, Texas
Educational institutions disestablished in 1986
1961 establishments in Texas